A glass-bottom boat is a boat with sections of glass, panoramic bottom glass or other suitable transparent material, below the waterline allowing passengers to observe the underwater environment from within the boat. The view through the glass bottom is better than simply looking into the water from above, because one does not have to look through optically erratic surface disturbances. The effect is similar to that achieved by a diving mask, while the passengers are able to stay dry and out of the water.

Use 
Glass-bottom boats are used for giving tours, as they are usually designed to allow the maximum number of tourists to view out the glass bottom. 

Glass-bottom boats are in use in many seaside tourist destinations as well as lake towns.

Typical tours in these boats include views of underwater flora and fauna, reefs, shipwrecks, and other underwater sights.

History 
The glass-bottom boat was invented in 1878 by two men, Hullam Jones and Philip Morrell, in Marion County, Florida. Jones outfitted a dugout canoe with a glass viewing box at the bottom, which allowed tourists to view the clear waters of Silver Springs, Florida. Eventually, the spring was purchased by Col. W.M. Davidson and Carl Ray, who developed a gasoline-powered glass bottom boat in 1924.

See also
AquaDom

References

Boat types
Glass applications
Glass architecture
Tourist activities